Hanamanakoppa is a small village in Haveri district, Hanagal taluk, Karnataka, India.

References

Villages in Haveri district